Lopamudra R (born 26 April 1978) is an Indian poet and translator writing in Malayalam language with the pen name Lopa. Her works include Parasparam, Vykkol Pava, which have won literary awards. She began writing poems at the age of 15 and became well known among literary circles at the age of 20.

Life
Born in Ayaparampu Panchayat in Haripad, Alleppey on 26 April 1978, she is the daughter of Muralidharan and Renuka. She inherited the literary affinity from her grandfather R K Kottarathil, who was a Harikatha artist and a teacher. Lopa lost her father at the age of 3.

After completing her Master's degree in English literature and BEd, Lopa focused more on her literary works. She has written many poems in Malayalam and translated many from English. Currently she serves as a member of the English faculty at Alagappa Nagar Government Higher Secondary School in Thrissur.

Honors and awards
2017 - O V Vijayan Memorial Award, for Vykkol Pava (Poetry Collections)

Notable works
2011 - Parasparam - poetry collection 
2015 - Vaikkol Pava - poetry collection

References

External links
Best Current Affairs
ManoramaOnline
Recipient of Kerala Sahitya Akademic Award (PDF)
Recipient of Njanapeedam Award from Malayalam

1978 births
Living people
People from Alappuzha
Poets from Kerala
Women writers from Kerala
Malayalam poets
Indian women poets
21st-century Indian poets
21st-century Indian women writers
Indian translators
Recipients of the Sahitya Akademi Yuva Puraskar